Joseph LeMar is a paralympic athlete from the United States competing mainly in category T44 400m events.

Joseph competed in the TS2 400m at the 1992 Summer Paralympics in Barcelona winning the gold medal.  He then missed his home games in Atlanta in 1996 but did return for the 2000 Summer Paralympics where as well as competing in the T44 400m and T46 4 × 400 m he won a bronze medal in the T44 800m. He now coaches high school track and field and cross country.

References

Paralympic track and field athletes of the United States
Athletes (track and field) at the 1992 Summer Paralympics
Athletes (track and field) at the 2000 Summer Paralympics
Paralympic gold medalists for the United States
Paralympic bronze medalists for the United States
Living people
Medalists at the 1992 Summer Paralympics
Medalists at the 2000 Summer Paralympics
Year of birth missing (living people)
Paralympic medalists in athletics (track and field)
American male sprinters
American male middle-distance runners
Sprinters with limb difference
Middle-distance runners with limb difference
Paralympic sprinters
Paralympic middle-distance runners